The 2002 Copenhagen Open was a men's tennis tournament played on indoor hard courts at the K.B. Hallen in Copenhagen, Denmark and was part of the International Series of the 2002 ATP Tour. It was the 14th edition of the tournament and was held from 11 February until 17 February 2002. Unseeded Lars Burgsmüller won the singles title.

Finals

Singles

 Lars Burgsmüller defeated  Olivier Rochus 6–3, 6–3
 It was Burgsmüller's only singles title of his career.

Doubles

 Julian Knowle /  Michael Kohlmann defeated  Jiří Novák /  Radek Štěpánek 7–6(10–8), 7–5
 It was Knowle's 1st title of the year and the 1st of his career. It was Kohlmann's only title of the year and the 1st of his career.

References

External links
 ITF tournament edition details

Copenhagen Open
Copenhagen Open
2002 in Danish tennis